Marco Vujic (born 21 February 1984) is a retired Austrian footballer of Bosnian descent. He was born in Zenica, Bosnia and Herzegovina. Vujic played for LASK Linz, FC Blau-Weiß Linz, KV Mechelen, SV Pasching, SC Schwanenstadt, Red Bull Salzburg, Austria Salzburg and Union Mondsee. He played for Red Bull Salzburg Juniors for 3 years, making 68 appearances and scoring 30 goals. On 31 July 2009 he signed for 2 years with Greek team Egaleo F.C. in Beta Ethniki. He signed for Austria Salzburg for the 2010–11 season.

References

1984 births
Living people
Austrian footballers
Egaleo F.C. players
Association football forwards